The Bloomfield River cod (Guyu wujalwujalensis) or the tropical nightfish, is a species of temperate perch endemic to Australia.  It is only found in an 11-km stretch of the Bloomfield River (between two large waterfalls) in northern Queensland.  These waterfalls appear to have blocked the migration of more aggressive tropical freshwater fish species such as the sooty grunter (Hephaestus fuliginosus) that have presumably naturally displaced the Bloomfield River cod from its former range in prehistoric times. With its very limited distribution, the Bloomfield River cod is clearly a relict species.  It is a very important relict species, however, as it is the most northerly distributed percichthyid species in Australia, and raises interesting questions on the biogeography of percichthyid fish in Australia and the history of their ancient colonisation of Australian rivers.

The species name wujalwujalensis comes from the Wujal Wujal Aboriginal community on the Bloomfield River, and the genus name Guyu comes from the tribe's name for this fish.  Bloomfield River cod are the only species in the genus Guyu.

Though named after the Australian freshwater cod species that are the most famous members of the family Percichthyidae (e.g. Murray cod), the Bloomfield River cod has little resemblance to the cod species.  In fact, it is very similar in shape and appearance to a juvenile golden perch in a gold/light bronze colouration.  It can reach a length of  SL.

References

Bloomfield River cod
Freshwater fish of Queensland
Bloomfield River cod
Taxobox binomials not recognized by IUCN 
 moved to Latin name redirect a-->